Ellis River may refer to different rivers:

Ellis River (Maine), United States
Ellis River (New Hampshire), United States
Ellis River (New Zealand)

See also 
 Ellis (disambiguation)
 West Branch Ellis River